Quadzilla may refer to:

 Jordan Watson (born 1987), English Muay Thai kickboxer
 Mo Sanders (born 1971), American roller skater
 Paul Demayo (1967–2005), American professional bodybuilder
 Tom Platz (born 1955), American professional bodybuilder
 Robert Förstemann (born 1986), track cyclist
Suzuki LT500R (1987-1990) Fastest 2 stroke quad made stock
 A. J. Dillon (born 1998), Former Boston College and Current Green Bay Packers running back